Dominik Szoboszlai (born 25 October 2000) is a Hungarian professional footballer who plays as a midfielder for  club RB Leipzig and the Hungary national team.

Coming through the youth system, Szoboszlai made his senior debut in 2017 with Austrian club FC Liefering, the reserve team of Red Bull Salzburg. In January 2018, Szoboszlai debuted with the parent club, becoming a starter from the 2018–19 season. Following three seasons, where he helped his club win three league titles and two domestic cups, in January 2021, Szoboszlai moved to Germany at RB Leipzig, a club associated with Red Bull Salzburg, for a reported of €20 million, making him the most expensive Hungarian footballer of all time.

Szoboszlai represented Hungary internationally, both at youth and senior levels. He made his senior debut at the Euro 2020 qualifiers, helping his country qualify to the finals by scoring in the last minute in the play-offs against Iceland.

Club career

Liefering
Szoboszlai made his professional debut in the 2017–18 campaign, with the Liefering in the second division against Kapfenberg on 21 July 2017. He scored his first professional goal against FC Blau-Weiß Linz on 4 August 2017.

Red Bull Salzburg
During the 2017–18 season, he made his debut against Austria Wien on 27 May 2018. He entered the pitch in the 57th minute as a substitute for Enock Mwepu. He scored his first goal for the club in 6–0 Austrian Cup win against SC Eglo Schwarz. He scored his first league goal against Wacker Innsbruck on 17 March 2019. On 17 September 2019, he made his Champions League debut and scored his first goal in this competition against Genk in a 6–2 victory. 

He scored a hat-trick as Salzburg won 5–1 against Sturm Graz on 10 June 2020. He finished the season with 9 goals and 14 assists in 27 league matches, and was voted player of the season for 2019–20 in Austrian football's top tier, the Bundesliga.

RB Leipzig 
On 17 December 2020, RB Leipzig announced the signing of Szoboszlai on a four-and-a-half-year contract, until June 2025. He became eligible to play in January 2021. With a reported price of €20 million, Szoboszlai became the most expensive Hungarian player in history. However, Szoboszlai could not feature in any match for RB Leipzig in the 2020–21 season due to a long-term injury. He finally debuted on 7 August 2021 in a German Cup game against SV Sandhausen where he entered the pitch in the 78th minute and scored three minutes later. On 20 August, he scored his first two goals in Bundesliga in a 4–0 win over VfB Stuttgart.  On 17 April 2022, he scored the only goal of the match between Bayer 04 Leverkusen and Leipzig on the 30th game week of the 2021–22 Bundesliga season.

International career

Szoboszlai was the captain of Hungary U17 team during the 2017 UEFA European Under-17 Championship in Croatia, he scored two goals and his team finished 6th in this tournament. He also was the captain of Hungary U19 team during the 2019 UEFA European Under-19 Championship campaign. He made his debut for U-21 team against Germany U21 on 1 September 2017.

He received his first call up to the senior Hungary squad for the friendly match against Russia and 2018 FIFA World Cup qualification against Andorra in June 2017. He made his debut for the senior squad on 21 March 2019 in a Euro 2020 qualifier against Slovakia as a 54th-minute substitute for László Kleinheisler. He scored his first international goal against the same opponent, Slovakia, in the same UEFA Euro 2020 run in a free kick at home.

He scored in yet another free kick in the 2020–21 UEFA Nations League B against Turkey, where Hungary emerged victoriously 1–0 away against Turkey in Sivas.

In the UEFA Euro 2020 qualifying play-offs game against Iceland, he scored a last minute winner to send Hungary into Euro 2020. Despite being initially selected to play in the latter, Szoboszlai withdrew injured on 1 June 2021. On 4 June 2022, Szoboszlai scored a penalty in a 1–0 win over England in the 2022–23 UEFA Nations League A, which was Hungary's first win against England since 31 May 1962, during the 1962 FIFA World Cup.

After the resignation of Ádám Szalai and long-term injury of Péter Gulácsi, the team mates of the national team and Marco Rossi appointed Szoboszlai as the new captain of the national team. Right after the friendly match against Luxembourg, Rossi said in an interview with M4 that Szoboszlai could become a top player soon, that is why he was elected as the captain of the national team.

Career statistics

Club

International

Scores and results list Hungary's goal tally first, score column indicates score after each Szoboszlai goal.

Honours 
Red Bull Salzburg
Austrian Bundesliga: 2017–18, 2018–19, 2019–20, 2020–21
Austrian Cup: 2018–19, 2019–20, 2020–21

RB Leipzig
 DFB-Pokal: 2021–22
Individual
Austrian Second League Team of the Season: 2017–18
Austrian Bundesliga Player of the Season: 2019–20
Hungarian Sportsman of The Year: 2020
Bundesliga Rookie of The Month: August 2021, October 2021, April 2022

Personal life
In an interview with Nemzeti Sport, Bendegúz Bolla said that Szoboszlai's father often made Dominik practice with golf balls in his childhood.

Szoboszlai spends his free time playing FIFA and watching anime. On 26 October 2022, 50 Cent was wearing Szoboszlai's t-shirt during his concert in László Papp Budapest Sports Arena.

References

External links

 Profile at the RB Leipzig website
 HLSZ 
 profile at magyarfutball.hu 
 at club home page 
 
 

2000 births
Living people
Sportspeople from Székesfehérvár
Hungarian footballers
Hungary youth international footballers
Hungary under-21 international footballers
Hungary international footballers
Association football midfielders
FC Liefering players
FC Red Bull Salzburg players
RB Leipzig players
2. Liga (Austria) players
Austrian Football Bundesliga players
Bundesliga players
Hungarian expatriate footballers
Expatriate footballers in Austria
Hungarian expatriate sportspeople in Austria
Expatriate footballers in Germany
Hungarian expatriate sportspeople in Germany